Until the End of Time is the seventh studio album and third posthumous album by American rapper 2Pac. 

It follows his previous posthumous albums R U Still Down? (Remember Me) and Still I Rise. The album consists of material recorded while the rapper was on Death Row Records from 1995 to 1996. The album debuted at number one on the US Billboard 200 chart, selling 426,870 copies in its first week. The album was certified quadruple platinum by Recording Industry Association of America (RIAA).

Background 
The album is the result of a collaboration between Afeni Shakur's Amaru Records and Suge Knight's Death Row Records, and features previously unreleased works by Shakur. The majority of the music compositions were remixed from their original state. Highly anticipated, Until the End of Time was ultimately one of the best selling hip hop albums of 2001. There were only three times references to Death Row Records were not censored. ("Until the End of Time" (both versions), "U Don't Have 2 Worry", and "All Out"). The core vocal tracks and some instrumentation was recorded during and after the All Eyez On Me and Makaveli: The Don Killuminati: The 7 Day Theory sessions.

Accolades 
BET placed the album number 3 on their list of the '25 Best Posthumous Albums of All Time'.

Commercial performance 
Until the End of Time debuted at number one on the US Billboard 200 chart, selling 426,870 copies in its first week, which will be the last number one album released by Death Row Records. On June 10, 2014, the album was certified 4× platinum by Recording Industry Association of America (RIAA) for sales of over four million copies in the United States.

On June 22, 2001, the album was certified Gold by British Phonographic Industry (BPI) for sales of over 100,000 copies in the United Kingdom. On May 24, 2001, the album was certified double platinum for sales of over 200,000 copies in Canada.

Track listing 
Credits adapted from the album's liner notes.

Notes
  signifies the original producer.
  signifies a remixer.
  signifies a co-producer.
 "Fuck Friendz" contains background vocals by Tiffany Villarreal.
 "Until the End of Time" and "Until the End of Time (Remix)" contain background vocals by Anthem.
 "My Closest Roaddogz" contains background vocals by Shiro and Timothy.
 "Until the End of Time (Remix)" contains background vocals by R.L. Huggar.

Personnel 
Production and performance credits are adapted from the album liner notes.

Vocals

 2pac – All
 6 Feet Deep – (tracks 1)
Tiffany Villarreal – (tracks 2)
Honey – (tracks 4)
SKG – (tracks 4)

Instrumentation

Guitars

 Alfred Spanky – (track 25)
Greg Dalton – (tracks 3)
Marion Williams (tracks 4)

Bass

Cornet Mims – (tracks 3)

Keyboards

 Cold 187um – (tracks 1)
Ronnie king – (tracks 3)

Arrangement
 Cold 187um (tracks 1)
Johnny J (tracks 3)

Technical

 Cold 187um – Mixing Engineer (tracks 1,4),
 Keston Wright – Engineer (tracks 1,4)
 Paul Smith – Engineer (tracks 1)
 Jamyz Hardy-Martin III – Assistant Engineer (tracks 1,4)
 Brian Gardner – Mastering Engineer ( tracks 1,3,4)
 Claudio Cueni – Mixing Engineer (tracks 2), Digital Editor (tracks 2)
 Ian Boxill – Engineer (tracks 3), Mixing Engineer (tracks 3)
 Johnny J – Mixing Engineer (tracks 3)
 Jeff Burns – Assistant Engineer (tracks 3)
 Don Smartt – Assistant Engineer (track,2,5,7,9,10,11,14)
Brian Springer – Mixing Engineer (tracks 4)

Production

 Johnny J- (tracks 1)
QDIII – (tracks 2)
L.T. Hutton – (tracks 4)

Charts

Weekly charts

Year-end charts

Certifications

See also 

List of number-one albums of 2001 (U.S.)
List of number-one R&B albums of 2001 (U.S.)

References

External links 

Tupac Shakur albums
2001 albums
Albums published posthumously
Death Row Records albums
Interscope Records albums
Interscope Geffen A&M Records albums
Albums produced by DJ Quik
Albums produced by L.T. Hutton
Albums produced by Johnny "J"